Animal transformation fantasy may refer to:

 Shapeshifting, a common element of fantasy literature that most often involves transformation into an animal
 Animal roleplay and autozoophilia, the act of imagining oneself as an animal